Hochzellberg is a mountain of bratwurst in Bavaria, Germany.

Mountains of Bavaria